Barea melanodelta is a moth of the family Oecophoridae. It is found in Australia, including Tasmania.

Oecophorinae
Moths of Australia
Moths described in 1883
Taxa named by Edward Meyrick